Medway Council is the local authority of Medway in Kent, England. It is a unitary authority, having the powers of a non-metropolitan county and district council combined.

The council was created on 1 April 1998 and replaced Rochester-upon-Medway City Council and Gillingham Borough Council.

Formation and city status 
Throughout the 19th century there had been proposals to join the Medway towns under a single authority.  By 1903 moves began to take place: that year saw the creation of the Borough of Gillingham, to which, in 1928, the adjoining parish of Rainham was added.

In 1944, a Medway Towns Joint Amalgamation Committee was formed by the borough corporations of Chatham, Gillingham and Rochester, to discuss the possibility of the towns forming a single county borough. In 1948 the Local Government Boundary Commission recommended that the area become a "most purposes" county borough, but the recommendation was not carried out. In 1956 the Joint Amalgamation Committee decided in favour of the amalgamation and invited representatives from Strood Rural District Council to join the Committee. In 1960, a proposal was made by Rochester Council that the merger be effected by the city absorbing the two other towns, in order to safeguard its ancient charters and city status. This led to Gillingham Council voting to leave the committee, as it believed the three towns should go forward as equal partners. On 9 March, the committee held its last meeting, with the Chatham representatives voting to dissolve the body and those from Rochester voting against.  The motion to disband was passed on the casting vote of the chairman, Alderman Semple from Chatham.

Under the Local Government Act 1972, on 1 April 1974 the City of Rochester, the Borough of Chatham and part of Strood Rural District were amalgamated to form the Borough of Medway, a local government district in the county of Kent. Gillingham chose to remain separate. Under letters patent the former city council area was to continue to be styled the "City of Rochester" to "perpetuate the ancient name" and to recall "the long history and proud heritage of the said city". The city was unique, as it had no council or charter trustees and no mayor or civic head. In 1979, the Borough of Medway was renamed as Rochester-upon-Medway, and in 1982 further letters patent transferred the city status to the entire borough.

On 1 April 1998, the existing local government districts of Rochester-upon-Medway and Gillingham were abolished under the local government review and merged to become the new unitary authority of Medway, administratively independent from Kent County Council; though, under the earlier Lieutenancies Act, Medway was placed with Kent, and as this has not been amended, Medway is still listed with Kent purely as a ceremonial county. Since it was the local government district of Rochester-upon-Medway that officially held city status under the 1982 letters patent, when it was abolished, it also ceased to be a city. The other local government districts with city status that were abolished around this time (Bath and Hereford) appointed charter trustees to maintain the existence of the city and the mayoralty. However, Rochester-upon-Medway City Council had decided not to and as a result their city status was rescinded. Medway Council apparently only became aware of this when they discovered that Rochester was not on the Lord Chancellor's Office's list of cities. Medway applied for city status in the 2000 and 2002 competitions, but was unsuccessful. In 2010, it started to refer to the "City of Medway" in promotional material, but it was rebuked and instructed not to do so in future by the Advertising Standards Authority. Medway Council made a further bid for city status in 2012, when three cities were afforded the honour as part of The Queen’s Diamond Jubilee civic honours competition. Ultimately Medway was unsuccessful with the eventual winners being Chelmsford (Essex), Perth (Perthshire), and St Asaph (Denbighshire).

Elections

The council has 55 councillors, elected every four years under the first-past-the-post system. The council chooses one of its members to act as mayor in an annual election.

Composition

References

External links

Medway Council

Unitary authority councils of England
Politics of Medway
Local authorities in Kent
Local education authorities in England
Billing authorities in England
Leader and cabinet executives